The 42nd Scripps National Spelling Bee was held in Washington, D.C. at the Mayflower Hotel on June 4–5, 1969, sponsored by the E.W. Scripps Company.

The winner was 14-year-old Susan Yoachum of Texas, an 8th grade student at Hill Junior High School in Dallas, with the winning word "interlocutory". Yoachum later became a well-regarded journalist, rising to the post of political editor at the San Francisco Chronicle. She died of breast cancer at age 43 in June 1998.

Second place went to 14-year-old Margaret Matthees of Huntsville, Alabama, who fell on "egalitarian". David Groisser, age 12, of Brooklyn, finished third, misspelling "quoits" as "".

First prize was $1000, second was $500, and third was $250.

There were 73 contestants this year. In the first day of competition, 464 words were used over nine rounds and the field was reduced to 23 participants. A total of 571 words were used by the end.

References

Scripps National Spelling Bee competitions
Scripps National Spelling Bee
Scripps National Spelling Bee
Scripps National Spelling Bee